Romska Inteligencia za Spolunazivanie is a political party of the Romany minority of Slovakia. Its policies are centre to left-wing with a focus on Romany rights and culture.

Romani political parties
Political parties of minorities in Slovakia
Romani in Slovakia